Tork Mahalleh (also Romanized as Tork Maḩalleh) is a village in Siyahrud Rural District, in the Central District of Juybar County, Mazandaran Province, Iran. At the 2006 census, its population was 149, in 39 families.

References 

Populated places in Juybar County